is a railway station in the city of Toyota, Aichi, Japan, operated by Meitetsu.

Lines
Hirato-bashi Station is served by the Meitetsu Mikawa Line and is 20.2 kilometers from the terminus of the line at Chiryū Station.

Station layout
The station has one side platform built on a curve, serving a single bi-directional track. The station has automated ticket machines, Manaca automated turnstiles and is unattended.

Adjacent stations

|-
!colspan=5|Nagoya Railroad

Station history
Hiratobashi Station was opened on October 31, 1924, as a station on the privately owned Mikawa Railway. The Mikawa Railway was merged with Meitetsu on June 1, 1941. The station has been unattended since April 1, 1967.

Passenger statistics
In fiscal 2017, the station was used by an average of 1526 passengers daily.

Surrounding area
 Kanpachi Gorge
 Meitetsu Kosaku High School

See also
 List of Railway Stations in Japan

References

External links

 web page 

Railway stations in Japan opened in 1924
Railway stations in Aichi Prefecture
Stations of Nagoya Railroad
Toyota, Aichi